Matamata-Piako District Council is the territorial authority for the Matamata-Piako District of New Zealand.

There are 12 elected members of the council: the mayor of Matamata-Piako, and 11 ward councillors.

Composition

Councillors

 Mayor 
 Matamata Ward: Kevin Tappin, James Sainsbury, Sue Whiting, Adrienne Wilcock
 Morrinsville Ward: Donna Arnold, Bruce Dewhurst, Neil Goodger, James Thomas
 Te Aroha Ward: Caitlin Casey, Teena Cornes, Russell Smith

History

The council was established in 1989, through the merger of:

 Piako County Council, established in 1876
 Te Aroha County Council, established in 1898
 Morrinsville Borough Council, established in 1921
 Matamata Borough Council, established in 1935

References

External links

 Official website

Matamata-Piako District
Politics of Waikato
Territorial authorities of New Zealand